Memories Are Now is the fourth solo studio album by American singer-songwriter Jesca Hoop. The album was released on February 10, 2017, through Sub Pop. It was produced by Blake Mills and features Fiona Apple on harmonica.

Reception

Memories Are Now received positive reviews from music critics upon release. At Metacritic, which assigns a normalized rating out of 100 to reviews from mainstream critics, the album received an average score of 83 based on 14 reviews, indicating 'universal acclaim'.

In a four-star review, AllMusic writer Marcy Donelson claimed, "The whole record, in fact, is injected with a heavy dose of gumption and irreverence, a spirit that, deliberate or not, seems timely in the sociopolitical climate of early 2017."

Track listing

Personnel
Jesca Hoop – vocals, guitar
Blake Mills – backing vocals, bass, drums, guitar, producer
Fiona Apple – harmonica (track 5)
Greg Leisz – guitar, pedal steel (track 8)
Rob Moose – strings (track 6)

Technical personnel
Eric Caudieux – engineer
Ian Sefchick – mastering
Greg Koller – mixing

References

2017 albums
Albums produced by Blake Mills
Jesca Hoop albums
Sub Pop albums